The American Basketball League played one full season, 1961–1962, and approximately one-third of the next season until the league folded on December 31, 1962. The ABL was the first basketball league to have a three-point field goal for shots attempted from longer distance. Other rules that set the league apart from the National Basketball Association (NBA) were a 30-second shooting clock, as opposed to 24, and a wider free throw lane of 18 feet instead of the NBA's then-standard 12.

Formation
The league was formed when Harlem Globetrotters owner Abe Saperstein was not awarded the Los Angeles National Basketball Association (NBA) franchise he felt he had been promised in return for his years of supporting the NBA with doubleheader games featuring his highly popular Trotters.

When Minneapolis Lakers owner Bob Short was permitted to move the Lakers to Los Angeles, Saperstein reacted by convincing National Alliance of Basketball Leagues (NABL) team owner Paul Cohen (Tuck Tapers) and Amateur Athletic Union (AAU) National Champion Cleveland Pipers owner George Steinbrenner to take the top NABL and AAU teams and players and form a rival league.

Saperstein was secretly planning the new league since 1959 but it is unclear whether he would have abandoned these plans were he granted the NBA franchise. In reality, Saperstein and Cohen each secretly made arrangements with local promoters in the other cities to finance those teams so there would be an eight-team league.

Saperstein placed the Los Angeles Jets to take on the transplanted Lakers. He got Bill Sharman as coach and signed former NBA players Larry Friend and George Yardley to give the team instant credibility. The idea backfired; the Jets did not last the season.

George Steinbrenner
In Cleveland, Steinbrenner's coach was John McLendon, who became the first African-American coach of a major pro basketball team. He was hired by Pipers' general manager, Mike Cleary, later the Executive Director of the National Association of Collegiate Directors of Athletics. McLendon had several of his star players from Tennessee State such as John Barnhill and Ben Warley, plus several former Akron Wingfoots, such as Johnny Cox and Jimmy Darrow, who had won the AAU National Championship the year before. In a game against the Hawaii Chiefs, Steinbrenner sold player Grady McCollum to the Chiefs at halftime. McLendon chafed at Steinbrenner's interference and quit in midseason, following the team's return from playing in Hawaii. Steinbrenner immediately named Sharman, from the recently defunct Jets, as his coach, and the Pipers went on to win the only ABL title in the league's brief history.

Jerry Lucas
Steinbrenner signed All-American Jerry Lucas to a contract worth $40,000. With the Lucas signing, Steinbrenner had a secret deal with NBA commissioner Maurice Podoloff. The Pipers would merge with the Kansas City Steers and join the NBA. A schedule was printed for the 1963–64 NBA season with the Pipers playing the New York Knicks in the first game. The gambit worked, but the ABL sued to block the move, and as a result Steinbrenner had a team and no league. Instead of returning to the ABL, Steinbrenner folded his tent. This chicanery masked a series of other ABL moves.

Relocation
The Hawaii Chiefs drew well, but other teams felt the cost of air travel was prohibitive, resulting in scheduling that saw the Eastern teams playing all of their games in Hawaii within a 5-6 day period and vice versa. After that first season, the Chiefs relocated to Long Beach, California. The San Francisco Saints escaped head-to-head competition with the newly relocated San Francisco Warriors by heading to Oakland. Paul Cohen, who secretly owned the Pittsburgh team as well as officially owning the Tapers, moved the Tapers again from New York, where they had been an NABL powerhouse for years, to Philadelphia, where he hoped to fill the void of the move of the Warriors (with Wilt Chamberlain) from Philadelphia to San Francisco.

The radical changes, combined with uneven attendance (although some teams, such as the Kansas City Steers, drew well), and no fresh capital from new owners, caused Saperstein and Cohen to decide to throw in the towel with the close of 1962 on December 31. The league that pioneered the three-point shot and the wider foul line (both eventually adopted by the rest of the basketball world) was gone. After the ABL folded, Steinbrenner had $125,000 in debts and personal losses of $2 million.

Teams
Chicago Majors (1961–62, 1962–63)
Cleveland Pipers (1961–62)
Kansas City Steers (1961–62, 1962–63)
Long Beach Chiefs (1962–63 as Hawaii Chiefs in 1961–62)
Los Angeles Jets (1961–62, disbanded during season)
Oakland Oaks (1962–63 as San Francisco Saints in 1961–62)
Philadelphia Tapers (1962–63, as Washington Tapers in 1961–62; moved to New York during 1961–62 season; as New York Tapers in 1961–62)
Pittsburgh Rens (1961–62, 1962–63)

Champions
Year | Winner | Result | Runner-up
1961–62 Cleveland Pipers 3 games to 2 games Kansas City Steers
1962–63 Kansas City Steers declared champions

Notable players
ABL players included the following: 

Jack Adams
Dick Barnett
Sylvester "Sy" Blye
Bucky Bolyard
Bill Bridges
Frank Burgess
Jeff Cohen
Kelly Coleman
Gene Conley
Johnny Cox
Connie Dierking
Bevo Francis
Connie Hawkins
Tony Jackson
Roger Kaiser
Maurice King
Herb Lee
Walt Mangham
Nick Mantis
Phil Rollins
Fred Sawyer
Ken Sears
Larry Siegfried
Bill Spivey
Bruce Spraggins
Larry Staverman
John F. Sullivan
Dan Swartz
Roger Taylor
Gene Tormohlen
Herschell Turner
Ben Warley
Win Wilfong
George Yardley
Wayne Yates

Rebirth
The Philadelphia Tapers, Kansas City Steers, Hawaii Chiefs, Cleveland Pipers, and  the Los Angeles Jets eventually returned to their NABL roots, where they continue as AAU Elite teams.

References

External links
 Association for Professional Basketball Research History of the American Basketball League
 

 
Defunct basketball leagues in the United States
Sports leagues established in 1961
Sports leagues disestablished in 1962
1961 establishments in the United States
1962 disestablishments in the United States